The Federation of Licensed Victuallers Associations is the UK trade association for self-employed licensees in the pub trade industry. The derivation is from a victualler of goods.

History 
It was formed in 1992 when the National Licensed Victuallers Association
was shut down, and the FLVA used the northern office of the NLVA. In December 2009, the Chief Executive, Tony Payne CBE, retired and day-to-day operational control passed to Martin Caffrey it moved its office location to York in 2013.

Structure 
It is based in York in North Yorkshire.  The management structure of the organization consists of a body of existing licensees headed by a President with a trustee overlay. Operational issues are handled through Operations Director. Membership is by annual subscription.

Function 
It represents self-employed licensees of public houses (pubs) in the UK, and local Licensed Victuallers Associations.  The landlord of a pub is known as a Licensed Victualler, the derivation is from a victualler of goods.

The Annual General Meeting is held each year no later than February currently in Harrogate in North Yorkshire.

The organization is involved with the day to day issues of the licensed trade offering practical assistance to its members and sees its role as that of being the "publicans partner" It offers advice on becoming a self-employed licensee providing assistance with staff employment, health and safety issues, disability audits, Landlord and Tenant Act legislation and rental and lease negotiations.

Through its Operations Director the FLVA is represented on Industry bodies such as the Pub Governing Body (PGB) which as part of its duties oversees dispute resolution services such as Pubs Independent Conciliation and Arbitration Service (PICAS) and Pubs Independent Rent Review Scheme (PIRRS) The Association is consulted by Government bodies and has input into industry matters through The Dept of Business Innovation and Skills and the VOA (Business Rates).

See also 
 British Institute of Innkeeping Awarding Body
 Licensing laws of the United Kingdom
 Licensing Act 2003
 Morning Advertiser
 The Publican

References

External links 
 FLVA

Trade associations based in the United Kingdom
Pubs in the United Kingdom
Organizations established in 1992
L
1992 establishments in the United Kingdom
Organisations based in North Yorkshire